The mountain serpent eagle (Spilornis kinabaluensis), also known as the Kinabalu serpent eagle, is a bird of prey that is found in northern Borneo. Where their range overlaps, the crested serpent eagle generally occurs at lower altitudes. The mountain serpent eagle is darker than the Bornean subspecies of the crested serpent eagle.

The mountain serpent eagle is threatened by habitat loss. However, they occur within the Kinabalu National Park and the Gunung Mulu National Park. Their high-altitude habitats are usually too remote for logging and agriculture, making some of its range secure.

References 

 Ferguson-Lees & Christie (2001). Raptors of the World. Christopher Helm, London.

External links

BirdLife Species Factsheet.

mountain serpent eagle
Endemic birds of Borneo
Birds of Brunei
Birds of East Malaysia
Vulnerable fauna of Asia
mountain serpent eagle
mountain serpent eagle
Fauna of the Borneo montane rain forests
Fauna of Mount Kinabalu